

Fishes

Newly named jawless vertebrates

Newly named acanthodian

Newly named placoderms

Newly named cartilaginous fishes

Newly named bony fishes

Notes

References 

2011 in paleontology